The Boris Chilikin class, Soviet designation Project 1559V Morskoy prostor (Sea space), is a series of fleet replenishment oilers built in 1970s for the Soviet Navy and currently in service with the Russian Navy.

History
As the Soviet Navy began to more regularly operate in large areas of the world's oceans and because of the emergence of the s, demand for large surface supply ships increased. In 1967, the TsKB "Baltsudoproyekt" (now Baltic Shipyard) received technical and tactical assignment for the design of Project 1559V sea oilers based on the civilian Project 1559 or Velikiy Oktyabr class. The main designers were S.N. Shumilov and Captain 2nd rank Yu. D. Makshanchikov.

Construction
When in standard load, the ship has displacement about 6,950 tons and 22,460 tons while fully loaded.

The oilers of this class are equipped with a device for the transfer of goods in move by the traverse method. This allows carrying out cargo operations during significant sea waves. A wide range of transported goods (for example, bunker fuel - 8,250 tons, diesel - 2,050 tons, jet fuel - 1,000 tons, drinking water - 1,000 tons, boiler feedwater - 450 tons, lube oil - 250 tons, provisions 220 tons) allows to rank the oilers of this class to the ships for providing of complex supply.

Armament
Originally, the ships were armed with two 57 mm AK-725 guns and two 30 mm AK-630 rotary cannons, but during later operations these defensive weapons were removed.

Ships

Boris Chilikin was transferred to Ukrainian Navy in 1997 as Makeevka and used as commercial bulk carrier since 2001.

References

External links

 Project 1559V Morskoy prostor

Auxiliary replenishment ship classes
Auxiliary ships of the Russian Navy
Auxiliary ships of the Soviet Navy
Oilers